Emma Edmondson (born 15 March 1984 in Rochdale, Greater Manchester) is a British television actress, best known for playing Mel Morton in Coronation Street. She joined the soap in March 2007. Prior to this she had a small role in the first series of BBC drama The Street. In 2008, it was announced that the Morton family had been axed from Coronation Street as part of a revamp by the new producer and they would no longer feature as of August.

Emma also appeared in the music video for Deadmau5's 2008/2009 hit single "I Remember". She appears in a club with red makeup around her eyes. The single peaked at number 14
on the UK Singles Chart in May 2009.

References 

1984 births
Living people
British actresses
Actors from Bolton
Actors from Rochdale
Actors from Lancashire